The 2002 Columbia Lions football team was an American football team that represented Columbia University during the 2002 NCAA Division I-AA football season. Columbia finished last in the Ivy League. 

In their 14th and final season under head coach Ray Tellier, the Lions compiled a 1–9 record and were outscored 295 to 161. Chris Carey and Pat Girardi were the team captains.  

The Lions' winless (0–7) conference record was the worst in the Ivy League standings. Columbia was outscored 223 to 115 by Ivy opponents. 

Columbia played its homes games at Lawrence A. Wien Stadium in Upper Manhattan, in New York City.

Schedule

References

Columbia
Columbia Lions football seasons
Columbia Lions football